Basic hostility is a psychological concept first described by psychoanalyst Karen Horney. Horney described it as aggression which a child develops as a result of "basic evil". Horney generally defines basic evil as "invariably the lack of genuine warmth and affection". Basic evil includes all range of inappropriate parental behavior – from lack of affection to abuse. This situation of abuse and torment that can not be avoided or escaped causes kids to have a higher level of irritability. The same can be said for anxiety.

Background 
Specifically, basic hostility pertains to a sense of anger and betrayal that a child feels towards his parents for their failure to provide a secure environment. Horney associated this concept with "basic anxiety", citing that the two are inseparably interwoven and are both offshoots of the "basic evil" of parental mistreatment. Their relationship can be explained in this manner: The existence of basic evil leads to basic hostility towards the parents and the world. Once such hostility is repressed it becomes basic anxiety or the feeling of being helpless.

The pattern of basic hostility
 The child wants to leave, but cannot. Although the child wants to avoid the abuse, their parents are perpetrating it.
 The child is dependent on their parents and therefore cannot move or back away.
 The child therefore redirects their feelings and expressions of hostility toward people they do not depend on for support.

According to Horney, some children find Basic Hostility to be an aggressive coping strategy and continue using it to deal with life's problems.

See also
 Basic anxiety
Disorganized attachment

References

Sources
 Personality Theories page on Karen Horney
 Women's Intellectual Contributions to the Study of Mind and Society: Karen Horney

Psychological concepts
Psychoanalytic terminology
Aggression